The ethnic groups of Southeast Asia comprise many different linguistic stocks. Apart from Negrito, which is a physical description, they are here arranged according to the family their languages belong to. Besides indigenous Southeast Asians, many East Asians and South Asians call Southeast Asia their home. The total Southeast Asian population stands at 655 million (2019).

Austro-Asiatic 

Vietnamese people
Thổ people
Chut people
Muong people
Mon people
Palaung people
Wa people
Khmer people
Bahnar people
Katuic peoples
Pear people
Khmu people
Nicobarese people
Senoi peoples

Austronesian

Javanese people
Osing people
Tenggerese
Sundanese people
Baduy
Kasepuhan
Malay people
Chitty
Jawi Peranakan
Minangkabau people
Madurese people
Batak people
Balinese people
Sasak people
Sumbawa people
Banjar people
Buginese people
Makassar People
Toraja
Mandarese People
Minahasan People
Acehnese people
Bantenese
Dayak people
Iban people
Lun Bawang/Lundayeh
Kadazan
Murut people
Cham people
Jarai people
Filipino people
Bicolano people
Gaddang people
Ilocano people
Ibanag people
Igorot peoples
Bontoc
Ibaloi people
Ifugao people
Isneg people
Kalinga people
Kankana-ey
Tingguian
Ilongot people
Itawis
Ivatan people
Kapampangan people
Lumad peoples
B'laan people
Bagobo
Mandaya
Manobo
Mansaka
Matigsalug
Subanon people
T'boli people
Mangyan peoples
Alangan
Tadyawan
Moro people
Iranun people
Jama Mapun
Kalagan people
Maguindanao people
Maranao people
Molbog people
Sama people
Sangirese people
Tausūg people
Yakan people
Pangasinan people
Sambal people
Tagalog people
Visayans
Aklanon people
Boholano people
Butuanon people
Capiznon people
Cebuano people
Cuyunon people
Eskaya people
Hiligaynon people
Karay-a people
Masbateño people
Porohanon people
Romblomanon people
Suludnon
Surigaonon people
Waray people

Negrito peoples 

Aeta people
Andamanese
Ati people
Mamanwa
Mani
Orang Asli
Semang

Sino-Tibetan

Tibeto-Burman

Bamar people
Karen people
Rakhine people
Kamein
Karenni people
Kachin people
Zo people
Chin people
Mizo people
Kuki people
Naga people
 Meitei people

Hua 
Han people
North Han people
Tientsinese
Beijingese
Shandongese
Hebeiese
Southwestern Han Chinese
Sichuanese
Yunnanese
Kokang people
Fujianese
Fuzhou people
Hokchia people (福清人)
Foochew people (福州人)
Henghua people
Hokkien people
Cambodian Hokkien
Quanzhou
Zhangzhou 
Taiwanese Hokkien people (in Malaysia&Singapore, in Vietnam)
Teochew people
Hainanese people
Cantonese
Kwongsai people
Szeyupese people
Guangzhounese
Weitou people
Hakkanese
Ho Poh people (河婆人)
Ngái
Taiwanese Hakka
Sam Kiang people (三江人)
Kiang Si people
Jianghuai people
Jiang Zhe people
Shanghainese
Wenzhounese
Other Han Chinese subgroups
Minh Hương
Tanka
Peranakan
Benteng Chinese
Sino-Native Malaysian
Sino-Dusun
Sino-Kadazan
Sino-Murut
Sino-Burmese
Sino-Thai
Chinese mestizo
Chindian

Hui 
Panthay
Chin Haw

Hmong–Mien

Sa
San Diu
Mien
Hmong
Miao
Gha-Mu people
A-Hmao people
Pa Then people
Gejia people

Kra-Dai 

Thai people
Lao people
Kadai peoples
Kam–Sui peoples
Tay people
Saek people
Nung people
Nyaw people
Lu people
Kongsat
White Tai
Shan people

Indo-Aryan and Dravidian

Indo Aryan
Rohingya people

Indo-Aryan and Dravidian
Burmese Indians
Indians in Brunei
Indian Indonesians
Indian settlement in the Philippines
Indians in Thailand
Malaysian Indian
Singapore Indian
Sri Lankans in Malaysia

Arabian 
Arab Malaysian
Indonesian Arab
Arab Singaporean
Arab Filipinos
Hadhrami people

Eurasian 
Amerasian
Filipino mestizo
Zamboangueño people
Eurasian
Eurasians in Singapore
Kristang people
Indo people
Anglo-Burmese people

See also
History of Southeast Asia
Demographics of Southeast Asia
Genetic history of Southeast Asia

References